The Journal of Head Trauma Rehabilitation is a bimonthly peer-reviewed medical journal covering rehabilitation medicine as it relates to head injuries. It was established in 1986 and is published by Wolters Kluwer. It the official journal of the Brain Injury Association of America. The editor-in-chief is John D. Corrigan (Ohio State University). According to the Journal Citation Reports, the journal has a 2017 impact factor of 3.406, ranking it 6th out of 65 journals in the category "Rehabilitation" and 61st out of 197 in the category "Clinical Neurology".

References

External links

Wolters Kluwer academic journals
Rehabilitation medicine journals
Bimonthly journals
Publications established in 1986
English-language journals
Neurology journals
Emergency medicine journals